Valea Carierei River may refer to:

 Valea Carierei, a tributary of the Nădrag in Timiș County, Romania
 Valea Carierei, a tributary of the Timiș in Brașov County, Romania